The Fifty Year Sword is a novella by Mark Z. Danielewski.

Synopsis
Chintana, a seamstress in East Texas, finds herself responsible for five orphans who are not only captivated by a storyteller’s tale of vengeance but by the long black box he sets before them. As midnight approaches, the box is opened, a fateful dare is made, and the children as well as Chintana come face to face with the consequences of a malice retold and now foretold.

Much like Danielewski's previous works, The Fifty Year Sword uses unusual formatting and color throughout. Five different colors are used for quotation marks in order to signal which character is speaking.

Publication history 
The Fifty Year Sword was published in both Dutch and English by publisher De Bezige Bij, but only 1,000 first edition English copies were released. 51 of those copies are signed in marker with a "Z" (varying in color and number to coincide with the 5 colored quotation marks that signify different speakers in the text), while the first copy is signed "Mark Danielewski" in ink. A second English edition of 1,000 was released in October 2006, while a slightly revised trade edition was published by Pantheon in October 2012.

Live performance
On Halloween night between 2010 and 2012, Danielewski conducted a live performance of The Fifty Year Sword at the REDCAT theater in Walt Disney Concert Hall. The performances featured five voices and large-scale shadows by shadowcaster Christine Marie.

References

External links
 Exploration Z - links to interviews, reviews and book scans

2005 American novels
American novellas
Novels by Mark Z. Danielewski
Postmodern novels
De Bezige Bij books